Jatoi  is the capital city of Jatoi Tehsil (administrative subdivision), in Muzaffargarh district, Punjab province, Pakistan. It is the 91st largest city of Pakistan by population.

The city have a Govt. Girls degree college. It is built recently in 2013. It has Govt. Boys Degree College   & High Schools for Boys & Girls. It also has a large number of private institutions. There is Sardar Kaure Khan Jatoi park and library is also going to built soon by Kauray Khan trust in the name of Sardar Kaure Khan Jatoi. Jatoi is an agricultural city, with very fertile soil and water provided by a canal system and tube wells, producing two or three crops in a year. Major crops are cotton, wheat, sugarcane, rice, and sunflower. The major fruits are mango, dates and jamun. Politicians include Sardar Abdul Qayyum Jatoi, Syed Abdullah Shah Bukhari and their sons, and later ones including Khan Muhammad Khan, Sami Ullah khan Laghari, Syed Jameel Shah Bukhari, Syed Azhar Hussain Shah, Syed Mazhar Hussain Shah, Syed Shreef Hussain Shah, Rana Wakeel & Malik Abdul Rasheed (Bao Rasheed). The city has a mosque, located in the Kotla Rehm Ali shah, a rural part of Jatoi Tehsil. The mosque is single mean of spiritual as well as enjoying place for people of Jatoi and concerned areas. The literacy rate is about 5%. The environment has been damaged by intensive felling of trees; but in 2012 more than 1000 trees were planted.
About 10 KM away from Jatoi City there is famous Mosque Jamia Sakeena-Tu-Sughra is situated.

Urbanization plan 
In 2021, The government of Punjab decided to urbanize 154 small cities and towns surrounding Punjab. The plan was forumlated in result of sharp increase in migration of people from these small towns to larger cities.

The five major cities — Lahore, Gujranwala, Faisalabad, Rawalpindi and Multan—were not included in the list as they already had master plans for their land use and zoning for residential, commercial, agriculture, and industrial activities.

2022 Flooding 
In August 2022, the city was struck by Major flooding, causing massive destruction in the city. Thousands of people were affected by the flood and lost their homes, which resulted in suffering of diseases and starvation.

Government officials visited the flood affected areas and formulated plans to conduct aiding and rescue operations.Chief Minister of Sindh, Murad Ali shah announced the allocation of budget particularly for re-construction of roads damaged by the overflow. Those roads play important role in the economy as they connect the villages to the markets for easy access.

Sports clubs of Jatoi
Mcc Tigers cricket club (REG) is well known sports club of Jatoi.
White Flower Cricket Club (REG)Is the Oldest And Well Known Sports Club Of Jatoi.
Reference by Adnan Farid Laskani

See also
Sardar Kaure Khan Jatoi

References

External links
 Jatoi Tehsil municipal administration

Populated places in Muzaffargarh District